Compsophila is a genus of moths of the family Crambidae. It contains only one species, Compsophila iocosma, which is found on Fiji.

The wingspan is about 24 millimeters, the forewings rust-red in color and the hindwings snow-white with a large rust-red subbasal spot, a broad discal band, and a small oblique spot near the middle of the outer margin.

References

Acentropinae
Taxa named by Edward Meyrick
Monotypic moth genera
Moths of Fiji
Crambidae genera